The 1999–2000 Eastern Counties Football League season was the 58th in the history of Eastern Counties Football League a football competition in England.

Premier Division

The Jewson Premier Division featured 20 clubs which competed in the division last season, along with two new clubs, promoted from Division One:
Clacton Town
Mildenhall Town

Sudbury Town merged with Sudbury Wanderers to form new club AFC Sudbury.

Histon won the league on the last day of the season, coming from behind to win 2-1 win away at Gorleston with Wayne Goddard scoring the winner in the 76th minute. The victory meant that title rivals Wroxham, who still had a game in hand against Warboys Town, could not catch them. Histon's victory gained them promotion to the Dr. Martens League and also saved Felixstowe Port & Town from relegation as, had Wroxham won, they would not have been promoted.

League table

Division One

Division One featured 16 clubs which competed in the division last season, along with two new clubs:
Cambridge City reserves
Ely City, relegated from the Premier Division

League table

References

External links
 Eastern Counties Football League

1999-2000
1999–2000 in English football leagues